Porcher is a French language word meaning "swineherd" (from Old French porc), from which a metonymic surname is derived. Variants of the surname include Le Porcher, Porchier, Porquier, Porquiez, Pourcher, Pourchaire, Porchet, Porchel, Porchat and Pourchet; and also diminutive forms Porcheray, Porcheret, Porcherot and Porcherel.

People with the name 
  (1753–1824), count of Richebourg, French physician and politician
 Josias Du Pré Porcher (c. 1761 – 1820), English politician
 Robert John Porcher Broughton (1816–1911), English amateur cricketer who played first-class cricket from 1836 to 1864
 William Porcher Miles (1822–1899), United States Representative from South Carolina
 William Porcher DuBose (1836–1918), American priest and theologian in the Protestant Episcopal Church
  (1940–2014), French sociologist
 Laurent Porchier (born 1968), French competition rower and Olympic champion
 Robert Porcher (born 1969), American football defensive end
 Thomas Porcher (born 1977), French economist
 David Porcher (born 1997), Scottish Paralympic athlete at the 2016 Summer Paralympics

See also 
 Porcarius

References